The 1999 K League was the 17th season of K League. In the second leg of the playoffs final, Saša Drakulić's golden goal scored with his hand caused controversy. His handball was recognized as a goal by the Chinese referee Sun Baojie, and it directly determined Suwon's league title. Under the influence of controversy, Drakulić failed to win the MVP Award.

Regular season

Championship playoffs

Bracket

Final table

Awards

Main awards

Best XI

Source:

See also
 1999 K League Championship
 1999 Korean League Cup
 1999 Korean League Cup (Supplementary Cup)
 1999 Korean FA Cup

References

External links
 RSSSF

K League seasons
1
South Korea
South Korea